Currituck Sound is a lagoon located in northeastern part of North Carolina and extreme southeastern Virginia.

On the northeast, it extends to Back Bay in northeast Virginia Beach, Virginia. A fork on the northwest leads to the Albemarle and Chesapeake Canal, which is a part of the Atlantic Intracoastal Waterway that connects the sound to Hampton Roads and the Chesapeake Bay. It ranges from 1 to 3 feet deep.

Although several inlets connected it directly to the Atlantic at one time or another, they have all since closed and there is now no direct access to the Ocean from the Sound. Thus contemporary salinity levels are very low, usually around 2-3‰ at the north end and 4-5‰ at the sound.

Currently, the only access to the ocean is through the Albemarle Sound, which joins the Currituck to the South, meaning that the sound has no lunar or solar tides. Instead, wind is the major force that moves water.

Currituck County's Mackay Island and Currituck National Wildlife Refuge as well as Back Bay National Wildlife Refuge and False Cape State Park in Virginia Beach border the sound and are winter habitats on the Atlantic Flyway. Many watersports activities occur in the sound, including parasailing, sea kayaking, and jet skiing. An area of barrier beaches, it is also noted for its duck and goose hunting.

See also
 Carova Beach, North Carolina
 Corolla, North Carolina
 Currituck, North Carolina
 Duck, North Carolina
 Knotts Island, North Carolina
 Monkey Island, North Carolina
 Point Harbor, North Carolina
 Sandbridge, Virginia
 USS Currituck (AV-7), a World War II era seaplane tender named for the Currituck Sound

References 

Bodies of water of Currituck County, North Carolina
Bodies of water of Dare County, North Carolina
Sounds of North Carolina